Tamatoa V, born Tamatoa-a-tu Pōmare, (23 September 1842, Moorea – 30 September 1881, Papeete), King of Raiatea and Taha'a, was a son of Queen Pōmare IV of Tahiti.

Life
Adopted by Tamatoa IV King of Raiatea and Tah'aa, he succeeded him on 19 August 1857 and crowned at Opoa by The Rev. Platt, 1 December 1860. Deposed on 8 February 1871. He married Moe Ma-hea-nu'u-a-Mai (Princess Moe-a-Mai) (elder daughter of Te-He-papai Ma-hea-nu'u-a-Mai, of Fa'a'ā, Judge of the High Court, Pastor and Member of the Supreme Council of Churches) and had two sons and four daughters:

Prince Teri’i-'o-uru-maona-tane Pomare (12 July 1867 – 15 December 1872), designated Crown Prince of Tahiti as Pōmare VI in eventual succession to his uncle Pōmare V.
Princess Teri’i-vae-tua-vahine Pomare (22 September 1869 – 4 December 1918), designated Heiress Presumptive of the Crown of Tahiti on the death of her older brother (15 December 1872), later designated Heiress Apparent in succession to Pōmare V (24 September 1877), in preference to any children that Queen Marau might give birth. Married 29 April 1884 (divorced 21 January 1893) to Teri’itonorua Norman Brander.
Princess Ari‘i-'otare Teri‘i-maevarua III (28 May 1871 – 19 November 1932), last Queen of Bora Bora. Married 9 January 1884 (divorced in 1887) to Prince Teri'i Hinoi-a-tua Pomare, chief of Hitia'a.
Prince Tamatoa-tane (22 September 1872 – 25 August 1873).
Princess Teri’inavahoroa-vahine Tamatoa Pomare Matauira (7 November 1877 – 3 December 1918), married firstly 27 August 1896 to 'Opuhara Salmon (d. 6 August 1908) and secondly 24 December 1910 to Teuraiterai Mote Salmon (d. 21 April 1926), her brother-in-law.
Princess 'O 'Aimata Teri’i-vahine-i-titaua-'o-ote-ra’i (29 June 1879 – 3 April 1894).

He died at Papeete, 30 September 1881. He was succeeded by Tahitoe, a member of the cadet branch of the Tamatoa Royal Family.

When George Herbert, 13th Earl of Pembroke visited the islands with Dr. George Henry Kingsley in 1870, he was stricken by his wife's charm and beauty and referred to the king and queen as "Beauty and the Beast."

Ancestry

References

Bibliography
 Bertrand de La Roncière: La Reine Pomare : Tahiti et l'Occident, 1812-1877, L'Harmattan, 2003.
 Teuira Henry: Tahiti aux temps anciens (French traduction from Bertrand Jaunez, Paris, Musée de l'Homme, Société des Océanistes, 671 p). original edition: Ancient Tahiti, Honolulu 1928.
 Anne-Lise Shigetomi-Pasturel: Raiatea 1818–1945: permanences et ruptures politiques, économiques et culturelles, Université de la Polynésie française, 3 vol., 517 p.
 Raoul Teissier: Chefs et notables au temps du protectorat: 1842 - 1880, Société des Études Océaniennes, 1996 (re-edition).

1842 births
1881 deaths
French Polynesian royalty
People from Raiatea
Oceanian monarchs
19th-century monarchs in Oceania
Pōmare dynasty